Relations between Belize and the United States have traditionally been close and cordial.  The United States is Belize's principal trading partner and major source of investment funds.  It is also home to the largest Belizean community outside Belize, estimated to be 70,000 strong.  Because Belize's economic growth and accompanying democratic political stability are important U.S. objectives, Belize benefits from the U.S. Caribbean Basin Initiative. Belize is the only country in Central America that has never received a visit from an American president.

History

The United States first established a consulate in British Honduras on 3 March 1847 when it was still a British colony. In 1965, the United States was briefly involved in the territorial dispute between Belize and Guatemala. Following Belize's independence from the United Kingdom in 1981, the U.S. established their embassy in Belize on 29 October.

International crime issues dominate the agenda of bilateral relations between the United States and Belize.  The United States is working closely with the Government of Belize to fight illicit narcotics trafficking, and both governments seek to control the flow of illegal migrants to the United States through Belize. Belize and the United States brought into force a stolen vehicle treaty, an extradition treaty, and a Mutual Legal Assistance Treaty between 2001 and 2003.

The United States is the largest provider of economic assistance to Belize, contributing $2.5 million in various bilateral economic and military aid. United States Agency for International Development (USAID) closed its Belize office in August 1996 after a 13-year program during which USAID provided $110 million worth of development assistance to Belize. Belize still benefits from USAID regional programs. In addition, Peace Corps volunteers have served in Belize since 1962. Until the end of 2002, Voice of America operated a medium-wave radio relay station in Punta Gorda that broadcast to the neighboring countries of Honduras, Guatemala, and El Salvador.  The U.S. military has a diverse and growing assistance program in Belize that included the construction and renovation of several schools and youth hostels, medical assistance programs, and drug reduction programs. Private North American investors continue to play a key role in Belize's economy, particularly in the tourism sector.

Resident diplomatic missions
 Belize has an embassy in Washington, D.C.
 United States has an embassy in Belmopan.

See Also
Confederate settlements in British Honduras
Belizean Americans

References

Further reading
 “Belizeans.” Encyclopedia of Chicago History (2005)
 Babcock, Elizabeth Cooling. "The transformative potential of Belizean migrant voluntary associations in Chicago." International Migration 44.1 (2006): 31–53. 
 Leonard, Thomas, et al. Encyclopedia of US-Latin American relations (3 vol. CQ Press, 2012). excerpt !:70-73.

 Stabin, Tova. "Belizean Americans." Gale Encyclopedia of Multicultural America, edited by Thomas Riggs, (3rd ed., vol. 1, Gale, 2014), pp. 289–299. online
 Straughan, Jerome F. Belizean Immigrants in Los Angeles (University of Southern California, 2004).

External links
 U.S. Embassy in Belize
    Belize Culture and Heritage Association (BCHA)

 
United States
Bilateral relations of the United States